Yenisu is a small village in Silifke district of Mersin Province, Turkey. The population of Yenisu   is 91  as of 2011 . The village was founded by Yörüks (once nomadic Turkmens) probably two centuries ago. Main crops of the village are vegetables and fruits such as apple and almond.

References

External links
Some images from the village

Villages in Silifke District